El Horreya Sporting Club, is an Egyptian football club based in Mersa Matruh, Egypt. The club is currently playing in the Egyptian Second Division, the second-highest league in the Egyptian football league system.

Egyptian Second Division
Football clubs in Egypt